Upałty Małe  is a village in the administrative district of Gmina Giżycko, within Giżycko County, Warmian-Masurian Voivodeship, in northern Poland.

The village has a population of 200.

References

Villages in Giżycko County